Brewlands Bridge is a hamlet in Glen Isla, Angus, Scotland. It is lies situated on the River Isla, eleven miles north-west of Kirriemuir and ten miles north of Blairgowrie, on the B951 road.

The original single segmented arch bridge, dating to the early 19th century remains, although it has been bypassed by a modern replacement.

References

Villages in Angus, Scotland